Reuben Mussey may refer to:
Reuben D. Mussey, American medical doctor
Reuben D. Mussey Jr., American lawyer, son of the above